Little Bear Lake Airport  is located adjacent to Little Bear Lake, Saskatchewan, Canada.

See also 
List of airports in Saskatchewan

References 

Registered aerodromes in Saskatchewan